Branden Jacobs-Jenkins is an American playwright. He won the 2014 Obie Award for Best New American Play for his plays Appropriate and An Octoroon. His plays 
Gloria and Everybody were finalists for the 2016 and 2018 Pulitzer Prize for Drama, respectively. He was named a MacArthur Fellow for 2016.

Early life
Jacobs-Jenkins was born in Washington, DC. His father, Benjamin Jenkins, is a retired dentist, and his mother, Patricia Jacobs, is a business consultant. 

He graduated from Princeton University in 2006, with a major in anthropology, and earned a master's degree in performance studies from New York University's Tisch School of the Arts in 2007. He has taught playwriting at the Tisch School and also at Princeton. He graduated from the Lila Acheson Wallace Playwrights Program at The Juilliard School.

Jacob-Jenkins worked at the New Yorker  where he edited and wrote reviews.

Career
In 2013 Jacob-Jenkins became a member of the Signature Theatre Residency Five program. The program "guarantees three full productions of new work."

Neighbors premiered Off-Broadway at the Public Theater/Public LAB in February - March 2010, and was presented at the Matrix Theatre Company, Los Angeles in August 2010, directed by Nataki Garrett. The play was produced by the Mixed Blood Theater, Minneapolis, Minnesota in September to October 2011, also directed by Nataki Garrett.<ref>Hetrick, Adam. "Branden Jacobs-Jenkins' 'Neighbors' Will Open Mixed Blood Season" 'Playbill, August 1, 2011</ref>  It premiered in Boston in 2011 with Company One.

He received the 2014 Obie Award for Best New American Play for his plays Appropriate and An Octoroon.Gans, Andrew. "59th Annual Obie Award Winners Announced; Sydney Lucas Is Youngest Winner in Obie History" Playbill, May 19, 2014An Octoroon is an adaptation of The Octoroon by Dion Boucicault. It first ran at Performance Space New York from June 24 to July 3, 2010. It ran Off-Off-Broadway at the Soho Rep in April 2014 to June 2014 and then at the Polonsky Shakespeare Center, Brooklyn, New York, from February 2015 to March 29, 2015.Magaril, Jon. "Review. An Octoroon" curtainup.com, accessed March 1, 2016 Artists Repertory Theatre, Portland, Oregon, staged An Octoroon from September 3 to October 1, 2017.Appropriate was produced Off-Broadway by the Signature Theatre, at the Pershing Square Signature Center, from March 16, 2014 to April 13, 2014. The play was nominated for the Outer Critics Circle Award for Outstanding New Off-Broadway Play, and also won 2014 Obie Awards for Direction (Liesl Tommy) and Performance (Johanna Day)." Appropriate Off-Broadway" lortel.org, accessed March 1, 2016 Michael Billington in his review of the 2019 production at the Donmar Warehouse (London), wrote: "...he appropriates the classic American family drama with results that are both gravely serious and mordantly funny...What is exhilarating about the play is that Jacobs-Jenkins pushes everything to the limits."War premiered at the Yale Repertory Theatre, New Haven, in December 2014, as a commission from the Yale Rep. Directed by Lileana Blain-Cruz, the cast featured Tonya Pinkins, Philippe Bowgen, Rachael Holmes, Greg Keller and Trezana Beverley. War opened at the Lincoln Center LCT3 series Off-Broadway on May 21, 2016 in previews, officially on June 6, directed by Lileana Blain-Cruz, and ran through July 3.Clement, Olivia. "Branden Jacobs-Jenkins’ War Begins Tonight" Playbill, May 21, 2016 He wrote War while on a Fulbright Fellowship in Germany.Sokol, Fred. "Regional Reviews. War. Yale Repertory Theatre" talkinbroadway.com, December 1, 2014, accessed March 2, 2016

His play Everybody was produced Off-Broadway by the Signature Theatre, and opened on January 31, 2017 in previews, officially on February 21. The play is "a modern riff on one of the oldest plays in the English language." Everybody is suggested by the 15th-century morality play Everyman. Directed by Lila Neugebauer, the cast includes Jocelyn Bioh, Brooke Bloom, Michael Braun, Marylouise Burke, Louis Cancelmi, Lilyana Tiare Cornell, David Patrick Kelly, Lakisha Michelle May and Chris Perfetti. The role of Everybody is chosen by lottery.Sullivan, Lindsay. "Branden Jacobs-Jenkins' Everybody Extends Before Opening Night Off-Broadway" broadway.com, February 13, 2017 Jacobs-Jenkins explained the play: "The concept...is that every night there’ll be a different Everyman, chosen by lottery, so the cast will shift a lot. This may be an insane idea. We’re assuming all these lovely actors are going to memorize the entire script.” Everybody is a finalist for the 2018 Pulitzer Prize for Drama.

His most recent play, Girls, premiered at Yale Repertory Theatre from October 4, 2019 to October 26. The play was directed by Lileana Blain-Cruz and choreographed by Raja Feather Kelly. The play is a contemporary version of Euripides’ Greek tragedy The Bacchae, and contains dance music and live-streaming video.Girls yalerep.org, accessed August 23, 2019

His work has been seen at The Public Theater, Signature Theater, PS122, Soho Rep, Yale Repertory Theatre, Actors Theater of Louisville, The Matrix Theatre in Los Angeles, Mixed Blood Theatre in Minneapolis, the Wilma Theater (Philadelphia), CompanyOne and SpeakEasy Stage in Boston, Theater Bielefeld in Bielefeld, Germany, the National Theatre in London, and the HighTide Festival in the UK.

Jacobs-Jenkins currently serves on the board of Soho Rep in New York City.

He joined the faculty of the University of Texas at Austin MFA playwriting program, in the 2019 semester. He is joined by Annie Baker, with whom he served as co-artistic directors for the MFA playwriting program at Hunter College of the City University of New York.

GloriaGloria was produced Off-Broadway at the Vineyard Theatre from June 15, 2015 to July 18, 2015 and was directed by Evan Cabnet. The play received a workshop at the Vineyard Theatre in January 2013. The play concerns an "ambitious group of editorial assistants at a notorious Manhattan magazine." Gloria was nominated for the 2016 Lucille Lortel Award, Outstanding Play. Gloria was a finalist for the 2016 Pulitzer Prize for Drama. The Pulitzer committee wrote: "A play of wit and irony that deftly transports the audience from satire to thriller and back again." Gloria received two nominations for the Outer Critics Circle Award: Outstanding New Off-Broadway Play; and Outstanding Director of a Play. The play was nominated for the 2016 Drama League Award for Outstanding Production of a Broadway or Off-Broadway Play.

A production was staged at London's Hampstead Theatre in June and July 2017.

A production was staged at San Francisco's American Conservatory Theater opening in February 2020 and closed early due to the COVID-19 pandemic. A livestream of the show was made available for a limited time.

Honors
He received the Helen Merrill Award in Playwrighting, Emerging Playwright category, in 2011.

He received the Paula Vogel Award from the Vineyard Theatre in 2011. The award is "presented annually to an emerging writer of exceptional promise." He was in residence at the Vineyard Theatre in 2011 because of the award."Branden Jacobs-Jenkins Wins 4th Annual Paula Vogel Playwriting Award" stage-directions.com, accessed March 2, 2016.

He was given the Steinberg Playwrights Award in 2015. Paige Evans, the artistic director of LCT3 said that his "plays are fiercely intelligent, ambitious, and boldly theatrical.... They challenge, entertain, and unsettle audiences, making us laugh, gasp, and think deeply about race, class, personal ambition, and other complex issues.”

He received the Windham–Campbell Literature Prize (Drama) at Yale University in 2016; the prize includes a cash amount of $150,000. He received the 2016 PEN/Laura Pels Theater Award, Emerging American Playwright. In 2016, he also received a Creative Capital award with collaborating artist Carmelita Tropicana.

He was named a MacArthur Fellow, Class of 2016. The fellowship comes with a monetary award of $625,000, made in installments over five years. The foundation noted, in part: "Many of Jacobs-Jenkins’s plays use a historical lens to satirize and comment on modern culture, particularly the ways in which race and class are negotiated in both private and public settings."

In 2018, Jacobs-Jenkins was a finalist for the Pulitzer Prize for Drama for his play Everybody.

In 2020, he was awarded USA Artists and John Simon Guggenheim Memorial Foundation Fellowships.

Plays

 Neighbors (Off-Broadway, 2010)
 War (Yale Repertory Theatre, 2014)
 Appropriate (Off-Broadway, 2014)
 An Octoroon (Off-Broadway, 2014)
 Gloria (Off-Broadway, 2015)Everybody (Off-Broadway, 2017)Girls'' (Yale Repertory Theatre, 2019)

Awards and nominations

References

External links
 

21st-century American dramatists and playwrights
African-American dramatists and playwrights
Obie Award recipients
Living people
Princeton University alumni
1984 births
American male dramatists and playwrights
MacArthur Fellows
MacDowell Colony fellows
Writers from Washington, D.C.
Juilliard School alumni
Tisch School of the Arts alumni
Tisch School of the Arts faculty
21st-century American male writers